Jugoslav Vlahović (born 1949) is a Serbian artist, illustrator, photographer and a former rock musician. Vlahović is known for his work on album covers. He is also known as a former member of the rock band Porodična Manufaktura Crnog Hleba.

He is the father of Jakša Vlahović, a member of the gothic metal band Abonos and thrash metal band Bombarder, and Marta Vlahović, a former Abonos member.

Biography
Vlahović was born in Belgrade in 1949. He graduated at the Second Belgrade Highschool and later at the Academy of Applied Arts in Belgrade. In 1968 Vlahović formed acoustic rock band Porodična Manufaktura Crnog Hleba with his sister Maja de Rado. The band released several 7-inch singles and one studio album, Stvaranje, before disbanding in 1975. During this period Vlahović also appeared in rock musical Hair performed at Atelje 212. Vlahović refused an invitation from Bora Đorđević to join Suncokret due to his army obligations. In 1976 Vlahović started working as an illustrator and cartoonist for NIN and retired from music. At the end of the 1970s he started designing album covers. In 1978 he designed a logo of the hard rock band Riblja Čorba, and in 1979 he designed a cover of their debut album Kost u grlu. The cooperation between Vlahović and Riblja Čorba continues to present day, as Vlahović designed all Riblja Čorba studio album covers, except Osmi nervni slom and Koza nostra album covers.

Vlahović is currently a professor of Graphic Design at Belgrade Faculty of Applied Arts. He had over 60 solo exhibitions. Vlahović is the author of eight books of his own cartoons and one portfolio of graphic prints. He received numerous awards for his work.

Album covers
Alisa – Alisa (1985)
Alisa – Da li si čula pesmu umornih slavuja? (1987)
Bezobrazno Zeleno – 1 (1983)
Bulevar – Loš i mlad (1981)
Bulevar – Mala noćna panika (1982)
Generacija 5 – Dubler (1982)
Rajko Kojić – Ne budi me bez razloga (1983)
Kornelije Kovač – Iz drugog filma (1982)
Srđan Marjanović – Ne kači se za mene (1981)
Vicko Milatović – U ritmu srca malog dobošara (1986)
Slađana Milošević – Gorim od želje da ubijem noć (1979)
Pop Mašina – Kiselina (1973)
Pop Mašina – Na izvoru svetlosti (1975)
Pop Mašina – Put ka Suncu (1976)
Riblja Čorba – Kost u grlu (1979)
Riblja Čorba – Pokvarena mašta i prljave strasti (1981)
Riblja Čorba – Mrtva priroda (1981)
Riblja Čorba – Buvlja pijaca (1982)
Riblja Čorba – Večeras vas zabavljaju muzičari koji piju (1984)
Riblja Čorba – Istina (1985)
Riblja Čorba – Ujed za dušu (1987)
Riblja Čorba – Priča o ljubavi obično ugnjavi (1988)
Riblja Čorba – Labudova pesma (1992)
Riblja Čorba – Zbogom, Srbijo (1993)
Riblja Čorba – Ostalo je ćutanje (1996)
Riblja Čorba – Nojeva barka (1999)
Riblja Čorba – Pišanje uz vetar (2001)
Riblja Čorba – Ovde (2003)
Riblja Čorba – Trilogija 1: Nevinost bez zaštite (2005)
Riblja Čorba – Trilogija 2: Devičanska ostrva (2006)
Riblja Čorba – Trilogija 3: Ambasadori loše volje (2006)
Riblja Čorba – Minut sa njom (2009)
Riblja Čorba – Uzbuna! (2012)
Rok Mašina – Rok Mašina (1981)
Rok Mašina – Izrod na granici (1983)
Smak – Rok cirkus (1980)
Suncokret – Moje bube (1977)
S Vremena Na Vreme – Paviljon G (1979)
Tunel – Niz tri tamne ulice (1983)
Vatreni Poljubac – To je ono pravo (1980)
Vatreni Poljubac – Bez dlake na jeziku (1980)

References
Jugoslav Vlahović biography at Riblja Čorba official site
Jugoslav Vlahović biography at www.wittyworld.com

External links
 
  (Serbian)
 Jovanović, Slobodan. „Retrospektivna izložba Jugoslava Vlahovića: Knjige otisaka 11. jun – 5. jul 2014.“, Muzej primenjene umetnosti, Beograd, 2014.  (Serbian)
 Mijalković, Aleksandra. „Karikatura kao sudbina /Ne samo o poslu - Jugoslav Vlahović/”, Politika, Beograd, 28. 8. 2011.  (Serbian)
  
 Discography at Discogs 
 Udruženje karikaturista Srbije FECO / Union of Cartoonists of Serbia — Federation of Cartoonists Organizations

1949 births
Living people
Artists from Belgrade
University of Arts in Belgrade alumni
Serbian graphic designers
Serbian illustrators
Academic staff of the University of Arts in Belgrade
Serbian rock guitarists
Serbian cartoonists
Serbian caricaturists
Serbian comics artists
Book designers
Logo designers
Album-cover and concert-poster artists